Brian Gottfried was the defending champion, but did not compete that year.

Tom Okker won in the final, 6–3, 2–6, 6–3, 3–6, 6–4, against Arthur Ashe.

Seeds
A champion seed is indicated in bold text while text in italics indicates the round in which that seed was eliminated.

  Guillermo Vilas (second round)
  Arthur Ashe (final)
  Ilie Năstase (semifinals)
  Jaime Fillol (quarterfinals)
  Adriano Panatta (first round)
  Eddie Dibbs (quarterfinals)
  Onny Parun (quarterfinals)
  Roscoe Tanner (quarterfinals)

Draw

 NB: The Semifinals and Final were the best of 5 sets while all other rounds were the best of 3 sets.

Final

Section 1

Section 2

External links
 1975 Paris Open draw

Singles